Helcystogramma triannulella is a moth in the family Gelechiidae. It was described by Gottlieb August Wilhelm Herrich-Schäffer in 1854. It is found in south-western and south-eastern Siberia, the Caucasus, Transcaucasia, Kazakhstan, Korea, Japan, China, northern India and large parts of Europe, except Ireland, Great Britain, the Netherlands, Denmark, Scandinavia, the Baltic region and the western Balkan Peninsula.

The wingspan is 12–15 mm. There are several generations between May and October in southern Europe.

The larvae feed on Ipomoea batatas, Convolvulus arvensis, Calystegia sepium and Calystegia japonica. They live in a folded leaf, held together by spinning.

References

Moths described in 1854
triannulella
Moths of Asia
Moths of Europe